Astragalus squarrosus is a species of milkvetch in the family Fabaceae.

References

squarrosus
Taxa named by Alexander von Bunge